Alexandre Nero Vieira (born 13 February 1970) is a Brazilian actor, singer, songwriter, musician, arranger, sound designer and musical director. In 2016, he was nominated for the International Emmy Awards for Best Actor, for his starring role in the telenovela A Regra do Jogo.

Filmography

Telenovelas

TV Series

Films

Theater

Awards and nominations

International Emmy Awards

Grande Prêmio do Cinema Brasileiro

Troféu APCA

Troféu Imprensa

Melhores do Ano

Prêmio Contigo! de TV

Prêmio Quem de Televisão

Prêmio Extra de Televisão

Prêmio Qualidade Brasil

Discography

Solo 
1995 – Camaleão
2001 – Maquinaíma
2011 – Vendo Amor
2014 – (Re)Vendo Amor

Group 
1999 – Oquelatá quelateje
2002 – Oquetalá VIVO
2005 – Musicaprageada
2006 – Denorex80
2007 – Chic Science

Notes

External links 
 

1970 births
Living people
Male actors from Curitiba
20th-century Brazilian male singers
20th-century Brazilian singers
Brazilian male film actors
Brazilian male telenovela actors
Brazilian composers
Brazilian male stage actors
21st-century Brazilian male singers
21st-century Brazilian singers